Sean Doherty (born June 8, 1995, in Conway, New Hampshire) is an American biathlete.

Career
Doherty competed at the 2014 Winter Olympics and the 2018 Winter Olympics.  Among other competitions, he participated in the Biathlon World Cup opening in 2015 in November and December.

He represented the United States at the 2022 Winter Olympics.

He is a specialist in the Vermont Army National Guard.

Biathlon results
All results are sourced from the International Biathlon Union.

World Championships
0 medals

*During Olympic seasons competitions are only held for those events not included in the Olympic program.
**The single mixed relay was added as an event in 2019.

References

External links

Team USA profile for Sean Doherty
Sean Doherty Personal website

1995 births
Living people
American male biathletes
American military Olympians
Biathletes at the 2014 Winter Olympics
Biathletes at the 2018 Winter Olympics
Biathletes at the 2022 Winter Olympics
Olympic biathletes of the United States
Biathletes at the 2012 Winter Youth Olympics
Youth Olympic bronze medalists for the United States
People from Conway, New Hampshire
United States Army soldiers
Vermont National Guard personnel